Chambéry Savoie Mont-Blanc Handball is a French handball team based in Chambéry in Savoie. The team plays in the French Handball Championship and it was founded in 1990.

Crest, colours, supporters

Naming history

Kit manufacturers

Kits

Team

Current squad

Squad for the 2022–23 season

Transfers
Transfers for the 2022–23 season

Joining
  Filip Ivić (GK) (from  RK Zagreb)
   Iñaki Peciña (LP) (from  Pays d'Aix UC) 

Leaving
  Nikola Portner (GK) (to  SC Magdeburg)
   Gerdas Babarskas (LB) (to  Pays d'Aix UC)
   Lars Mousing (LP) (to  Skanderborg Aarhus Håndbold)

Retired numbers

Honours
France Handball League: 1
Champion :  2001.
Runner Up : 1998, 1999, 2000, 2002, 2003, 2006, 2008, 2009, 2010, 2011, 2012.

Coupe de la Ligue: 1
Winner : 2002
Runner Up : 2011

Trophée des Champions: 1
Winner : 2013
Runner Up : 2010, 2011, 2012

Coupe de France: 1
Winner : 2019
Runner Up : 2002, 2005, 2009, 2011, 2014

EHF Cup:
Semi-finalist : 2016

European record

Former club members

Notable former players

  Xavier Barachet (2006–2012)
  Laurent Busselier (2000–2013)
  Grégoire Detrez (2008–2017)
  Cyril Dumoulin (2000–2014)
  Yann Genty (2014–2020)
  Benjamin Gille (2000–2018)
  Bertrand Gille (1996–2002, 2012–2015)
  Guillaume Gille (1996–2002, 2012–2014)
  Guillaume Joli (2004–2010)
  Johannes Marescot (2011–2014, 2015–2020)
  Olivier Marroux (2011–2014)
  Julien Meyer (2016–2021)
  Quentin Minel (2006–2009)
  Laurent Munier (1999–2002)
  Thimothey N'Guessan (2011–2016)
  Daniel Narcisse (1998–2004, 2007–2009)
  Alix Nyokas (2012–2014)
  Émeric Paillasson (1997–2005)
  Pierre Paturel (2005–)
  Cédric Paty (2006–2016)
  Jackson Richardson (2005–2008)
  Melvyn Richardson (2005–2017)
  Mickaël Robin (2008–2010)
  Bertrand Roiné (2006–2012)
  Seufyann Sayad (2002–2004)
  Guillaume Saurina (2010–2011)
  Stéphane Stoecklin (1985–1988, 2003–2005)
  Queido Traoré (2012–)
  Alexandre Tritta (2011–)
  Marc Wiltberger (2001–2004)
  El Hadi Biloum (2005–2006)
  Edin Bašić (2017–2018)
  Marko Panić (2012–2017)
  João Pedro Silva (2015–2017)
  Damir Bičanić (2010–2017)
  Igor Kos (2000–2002)
  Jerko Matulić (2014–2016)
  Vlado Šola (2002–2004)
  Karel Nocar (2003–2013)
  Alejandro Costoya (2018–)
  Iosu Goñi Leoz (2020–)
  Niko Mindegia (2017–2019)
  Iñaki Peciña (2022–)
  Volker Michel (2002–2003)
  Attila Borsos (1994–2000)
  Gábor Császár (2009–2010)
   Gerdas Babarskas (2018–2022)
  Fahrudin Melić (2016–2020)
  Radivoje Ristanović (2016)
  Demis Grigoraș (2019–2021)
  Edouard Moskalenko (2001–2007)
  Jure Natek (2007–2009)
  Sebastian Skube (2021–)
  Zoran Đorđić (1995–1997)
  Nebojša Stojinović (2004–2008)
  Nenad Vučković (2004–2007)
  Lukas von Deschwanden (2019–2020)
  Nikola Portner (2020–2022)
  Mosbah Sanaï (2017–2018)

Former coaches

References

External links
  
 

French handball clubs
Sport in Chambéry
Sport in Savoie